The 1961 NCAA University Division baseball tournament was played at the end of the 1961 NCAA University Division baseball season to determine the national champion of college baseball.  The tournament concluded with eight teams competing in the College World Series, a double-elimination tournament in its fifteenth year.  Eight regional districts sent representatives to the College World Series with preliminary rounds within each district serving to determine each representative.  These events would later become known as regionals.  Each district had its own format for selecting teams, resulting in 25 teams participating in the tournament at the conclusion of their regular season, and in some cases, after a conference tournament.  The College World Series was held in Omaha, NE from June 9 to June 14.  The fifteenth tournament's champion was Southern California, coached by Rod Dedeaux.  The Most Outstanding Player was Littleton Fowler of runner-up Oklahoma State.

Tournament

District 1
Games played at Springfield, Massachusetts.

District 2
Games played at Syracuse, New York.

District 3
Games played at Gastonia, North Carolina.

District 4
Games played at Ann Arbor, Michigan.

District 5
Games played at Stillwater, Oklahoma.

District 6
Games played at Austin, Texas.

District 7
Games played at Laramie, Wyoming.

District 8

College World Series

Participants

Results

Bracket

Game results

All-Tournament Team
The following players were members of the All-Tournament Team.

Notable players
 Boston College: 
 Duke: Ron Davis
 Colorado State College: 
 Oklahoma State: Don Wallace
 Southern California: Dan Ardell, Mike Gillespie, Marcel Lachemann, Tom Satriano, Ron Stillwell, Wally Wolf
 : Bill Connors, Dave Giusti
 Texas: Bill Bethea
 Western Michigan: Roger Theder, Frank Quilici

Notes

See also
 1961 NAIA World Series

References

NCAA Division I Baseball Championship
Tournament
Baseball in Austin, Texas